Stigmella centifoliella is a moth of the family Nepticulidae. It is found from Scandinavia to the Iberian Peninsula, Italy, Albania and Greece, and from Great Britain to Ukraine. It is also present in North Africa.

The wingspan is 4–6 mm. The head is ferruginous-orange, collar light yellowish. Antennal eyecaps ochreous-whitish. Forewings rather dark fuscous, slightly tinged with bronze or purple ; a shining whitish fascia beyond middle ; apical area beyond this more purple-tinged. Hindwings grey.

Adults are on wing from July to October.

The larvae feed on Rosa acicularis, Rosa × bifera, Rosa canina, Rosa centifolia, Rosa glauca, Rosa 'Hybrida', Rosa jundzillii, Rosa majalis, Rosa multiflora, Rosa pendulina, Rosa phoenicea, Rosa pimpinellifolia, Rosa rubiginosa, Rosa soulieana, Rosa tomentosa, Rosa wichurana, Sanguisorba hybrida, Sanguisorba minor and Sanguisorba officinalis. Larvae have also been reared from Alchemilla species. They mine the leaves of their host plant. The mine consists of a long sinuous gallery, often with a hairpin turn. The frass in the first part of the corridor is concentrated in a central line, leaving a clear zone at either side.

References

External links
Fauna Europaea
bladmineerders.nl
Swedish moths
 Stigmella centifoliella images at  Consortium for the Barcode of Life

Nepticulidae
Moths of Europe
Moths of Africa
Taxa named by Philipp Christoph Zeller
Moths described in 1848